Courtney Smith, better known by his stage name Fresh Caesar, is an American rapper, song writer and entrepreneur.   The artist Fresh Caesar first emerged on the hip hop scene in the 2009 release of Big Von presents Kaz Kyzah: Gofessional 2.
   In less than 2 years since his first appearance, Fresh Caesar has released 2 highly successful Mixtapes; The Breakthrough Vol. 1 and 2.

In October 2011, Fresh Caesar was featured alongside rappers Paul Wall, Mistah F.A.B., Hopsin, and J Peezy in a battle rap mobile game called Battle Rap Stars.

Discography 
Mix Tapes
2008: "Pursuit of Happyness"
2010: "The Breakthrough Vol. 1"
2011: "The Breakthrough Vol. 2"

Video Games
2011: ''Battle Rap Stars for iPhone and Android

References

External links 

 
 Fresh Caesar at Twitter

1977 births
Living people
Rappers from California
Songwriters from California
Musicians from Oakland, California
21st-century American rappers